Sir Alfred Brian Pippard, FRS (7 September 1920 – 21 September 2008), was a British physicist. He was Cavendish Professor of Physics from 1971 until 1982 and an Honorary Fellow of Clare Hall, Cambridge, of which he was the first President.

Biography
Pippard was educated at Clifton College and Clare College, Cambridge, where he graduated with MA (Cantab) and PhD degrees. 

After working as a scientific officer in radar research during the Second World War, he was appointed as a Demonstrator in Physics at the University of Cambridge in 1946, subsequently becoming a Lecturer in the subject in 1950, a Reader in 1959, and the first John Humphrey Plummer Professor of Physics a year later. In 1971 he was elected Cavendish Professor of Physics.

Pippard demonstrated the reality, as opposed to the mere abstract concept, of Fermi surfaces in metals by establishing the shape of the Fermi surface of copper through measuring the reflection and absorption of microwave electromagnetic radiation (see the anomalous skin effect). He also introduced the notion of coherence length in superconductors in his proposal for the non-local generalisation of the London equations concerning electrodynamics in superfluids and superconductors. The non-local kernel proposed by Pippard, inferred on the basis of Chambers' non-local generalisation of Ohm's law) can be deduced within the framework of the BCS (Bardeen, Cooper and Schrieffer) theory of superconductivity (a comprehensive description of the details of the London–Pippard theory can be found in the book by Fetter and Walecka).

Pippard was the author of Elements of Classical Thermodynamics for Advanced Students of Physics,
Dynamics of Conduction Electrons, and The Physics of Vibration. He also co-authored the three-volumes encyclopaedia Twentieth Century Physics. 

As the Cavendish Professor of Physics at Cavendish Laboratory, University of Cambridge, he compiled Cavendish Problems in Classical Physics, based in large part on past examination questions for Cambridge physics students.

Pippard was the doctoral supervisor of Brian David Josephson (awarded PhD in Physics in 1964) who in 1973 received the Nobel Prize in Physics (together with Leo Esaki and Ivar Giaever) for his discovery of what is known as the Josephson effect.

References

Obituaries 
 Anthony Tucker, Sir Brian Pippard, The Guardian, Wednesday, 25 September 2008, .
 John Waldram, Professor Sir Brian Pippard (1920–2008), News and Events, University Offices, University of Cambridge, 24 September 2008, .
 Professor Sir Brian Pippard (1920–2008), Cambridge Network, 25 September 2008,  (Reproduced from University of Cambridge Office of Communications).
 John Waldram, Brian Pippard (1920–2008): Low-temperature physicist who excelled in subtle intuitive concepts, Nature 455, 1191 (30 October 2008), .
 Professor Sir Brian Pippard, Telegraph, 23 September 2008, .
 Professor Sir Brian Pippard: Cambridge physicist, The Times, 25 September 2008, .
 Richard Eden, Professor Sir Brian Pippard: Physicist who proved the existence of the Fermi surface and was the first President of Clare Hall, Cambridge, The Independent, Tuesday, 7 October 2008, .
 Hamish Johnston, Sir Brian Pippard: 1920–2008, PhysicsWorld, 24 September 2008, .

External links
 The Cavendish Professorship of Physics , Cavendish Laboratory, University of Cambridge, Department of Physics.
The Brian Pippard Building, Cambridge
 Professor George Zarnecki, Lives remembered: Professor George Zarnecki and Professor Sir Brian Pippard, The Times, 27 September 2008, .
 Professor Ernst Sondheimer, Professor Sir Brian Pippard, The Independent, Friday, 10 October 2008, .
 Professor Sir Brian Pippard, President of CUMS, 7 September 1920 – 21 September 2008, Cambridge University Musical Society (CUMS) News, 25 September 2008,  .
 Brian Pippard dies aged 88, Varsity, 2008, .
 Professor Pippard papers HF/LEEWW: 2000.611 2000, The National Archives, .Contents: Typewritten manuscript by Professor Sir Brian Pippard entitled 'Reminiscences of Wartime Radar Research 1941–1945', together with three papers published in The Journal of The Institution of Electrical Engineers in 1946.
 interviewed by Alan Macfarlane 31 March 2008 (video)

1920 births
2008 deaths
Fellows of the Royal Society
British physicists
Knights Bachelor
Alumni of Clare College, Cambridge
Fellows of Clare Hall, Cambridge
People educated at Clifton College
Presidents of the Institute of Physics
Presidents of Clare Hall, Cambridge
Cavendish Professors of Physics
John Humphrey Plummer Professors